Darlene may refer to:
Darlene (given name), people with the given name Darlene
Darlene (artist), American artist formerly known as Darlene Pekul 
"Darlene" (Led Zeppelin song)
"Darlene" (T. Graham Brown song)